Albania has participated in every edition of the Summer Youth Olympic Games since the inaugural 2010 Games and they participated in the Winter Youth Olympic Games  for the first time in the 2020 Games.

Medal tables

Medals by Summer Games

Medals by Winter Games

Flag bearers

See also
Albania at the Olympics
Albania at the Paralympics

External links
Albania Olympic Committee

 
Nations at the Youth Olympic Games
Youth sport in Albania